Ilu  or ILU may refer to:

 Ilu (drum), a Brazilian instrument
 Ilu, Iran, a village in Kurdistan Province, Iran
 Inter-Language Unification, WWW project
 International Longshoremen's Association, labor union
 Incomplete LU factorization 
ilu, the nominative plural masculine form of the Akkadian stem il-, "god"
 A species of plesiosaur-like creatures from the film franchise Avatar
 Abbreviation of the phrase "I Love You" in texting slang